Drovers Inn and Round Family Residence consists of an historic home and an historic inn located at Vestal in Broome County, New York.  The Drovers Inn was built about 1844 and the Rounds Family Residence was built  1895–1912. The inn is a -story wood-frame Greek Revival structure with an overlay of elaborate Victorian-era decoration added about 1880.  The residence was built in 1895 and features an engaged tower with a bell cast roof added in 1912.

It was listed on the National Register of Historic Places in 2010.

References

Houses in Broome County, New York
Houses completed in 1844
Houses on the National Register of Historic Places in New York (state)
Hotel buildings on the National Register of Historic Places in New York (state)
National Register of Historic Places in Broome County, New York
Greek Revival houses in New York (state)
Victorian architecture in New York (state)